Carolyn Wells (June 18, 1862 — March 26, 1942) was an American mystery author.

Life and career 
Born in Rahway, New Jersey, she was the daughter of William E. and Anna Wells.

After finishing school she worked as a librarian for the Rahway Library Association. Her first book, At the Sign of the Sphinx (1896), was a collection of literary charades. Her next publications were The Jingle Book and The Story of Betty (1899), followed by a book of verse entitled Idle Idyls (1900). After 1900, Wells wrote numerous novels and collections of poetry.

Carolyn Wells wrote a total 170 books. During the first ten years of her career, she concentrated on poetry, humor, and children's books. According to her autobiography, The Rest of My Life (1937), she heard That Affair Next Door (1897), one of Anna Katharine Green's mystery novels, being read aloud and was immediately captivated by the unraveling of the puzzle. From that point onward she devoted herself to the mystery genre. Among the most famous of her mystery novels were the Fleming Stone Detective Stories which—according to Allen J. Hubin's Crime Fiction IV: A Comprehensive Bibliography, 1749–2000 (2003)—number 61 titles. Wells's The Clue (1909) is on the Haycraft-Queen Cornerstone list of essential mysteries. She was also the first to conduct a (brief, in this case) annual series devoted to the best short crime fiction of the previous year in the U.S., beginning with The Best American Mystery Stories of the Year (1931) (though others had begun a similar British series in 1929).

In addition to books, Wells also wrote for newspapers. Her poetry accompanies the work of some of the leading lights in illustration and cartooning, often in the form of Sunday magazine cover features that formed continuing narratives from week to week. Her first known illustrated newspaper work is a two part series titled Animal Alphabet, illustrated by William F. Marriner, which appeared in the Sunday comics section of the New York World. Many additional series ensued over the years, including the bizarre classic Adventures of Lovely Lilly (New York Herald, 1906–07). The last series she penned was Flossy Frills Helps Out (American Weekly, 1942), which appeared after her death.

She died at the Flower Fifth Avenue Hospital in New York City in 1942.

Wells had been married to Hadwin Houghton, the heir of the Houghton-Mifflin publishing empire founded by H.O.Houghton. Wells also had an impressive collection of volumes of poetry by others. She bequeathed her collection of Walt Whitman poetry, said to be one of the most important of its kind for its completeness and rarity, to the Library of Congress.

Adult fiction

Before 1900
 at the sign of shinx (1896)
 the jingle book(original version) (1899)
 the story of betty (1899)
Fleming Stone mysteries
 The Clue (1909)
 The Gold Bag (1911). First published Lippincott's Magazine, February 1910.
 A Chain of Evidence (1912)
 The Maxwell Mystery (1913)
 Anybody But Anne (1914)
 The White Alley (1915)
 The Curved Blades (1915)
 The Mark of Cain (1917)
 Vicky Van (1918)
 The Diamond Pin (1919)
 Raspberry Jam (1920)
 The Mystery of the Sycamore (1921)
 The Mystery Girl (1922)
 Feathers Left Around (1923)
 Spooky Hollow (1923)
 The Furthest Fury (1924)
 Prillilgirl (1924)
 Anything But the Truth (1925)
 The Daughter of the House (1925)
 The Bronze Hand (1926)
 The Red-Haired Girl (1926)
 The Vanity Case (1926)
 All at Sea (1927)
 Where Emily (1927)
 The Crime in the Crypt (1928)
 The Tannahill Tangle (1928)
 The Tapestry Room Murder (1928)
 Triple Murder (1929)
 The Doomed Five (1930)
 The Ghosts' High Noon (1930)
 Horror House (1931)
 The Umbrella Murder (1931)
 Fuller Earth (1932)
 The Roll-Top Desk Mystery (1932)
 The Broken O (1933) (also published as Honeymoon Murder)
 The Clue of the Eyelash (1933)
 The Master Murderer (1933)
 Eyes in the Wall (1934)
 The Visiting Villain (1934)
 The Beautiful Derelict (1935)
 For Goodness' Sake (1935)
 The Wooden Indian (1935)
 The Huddle (1936)
 In the Tiger Cage (1936)
 Money Musk (1936)
 Murder in the Bookshop (1936)
 The Mystery of the Tarn (1937)
 The Radio Studio Murder (1937)
 Gilt Edged Guilt (1938)
 The Killer (1938)
 The Missing Link (1938)
 Calling All Suspects (1939)
 Crime Tears On (1939)
 The Importance of Being Murdered (1939)
 Crime Incarnate (1940)
 Devil Work (1940)
 Murder On Parade (1940)
 Murder Plus (1940)
 The Black Night Murders (1941)
 Murder at the Casino (1941)
 Murder Will In (1942)
 Who Killed Caldwell? (1942)

Alan Ford
 The Bride of a Moment (1916)
 Faulkner Folly (1917)
 
Pennington Wise
 The Room with the Tassels (1918)
 The Man Who Fell Through the Earth (1919)
 In the Onyx Lobby (1920)
 The Come-Back (1921)
 The Luminous Face (1921)
 The Vanishing of Betty Varian (1922)
 The Affair at Flower Acres (1923)
 Wheels Within Wheels (1923)

Kenneth Carlisle
 Sleeping Dogs (1929)
 The Doorstep Murders (1930)
 The Skeleton at the Feast (1931)

Other mysteries
 The Adventure of the Clothes-Line (The Century magazine, May 1915)
 More Lives Than One (1923)
 The Fourteenth Key (1924)
 The Moss Mystery (1924)
 Face Cards (1925) (features Tony Barron)
 The Deep-Lake Mystery (1928) (features Blake Norris)

Other novels
 Abeniki Caldwell: A Burlesque Historical Novel (1902)
 The Emily Emmins Papers (1907)
 The Lover's Baedeker and Guide to Arcady (1912) (a fictional guidebook)
 Ptomaine Street: A Tale of Warble Petticoat (1921)

Story collections
 The Omnibus Fleming Stone (1923) (Includes Vicky Van, Spooky Hollow, The Mystery of the Sycamore, The Curved Blades)

Children's fiction
Patty Fairfield 
 Patty Fairfield (1901)
 Patty at Home (1904)
 Patty in the City (1905)
 Patty Summer Days (1906)
 Patty in Paris (1907)
 Patty Friends (1908)
 Patty Pleasure Trip (1909)
 Patty Success (1910)
 Patty Motor Car (1911)
 Patty Butterfly Days (1912)
 Patty Social Season (1913)
 Patty Suitors (1914)
 Patty Romance (1915)
 Patty Fortune (1916)
 Patty Blossom (1917)
 Patty-Bride (1918)
 Patty and Azalea (1919)
 How to Tell a wild animal
Marjorie Maynard
 Marjorie Vacation (1907)
 Marjorie Busy Days (1908)
 Marjorie New Friend (1909)
 Marjorie in Command (1910)
 Marjorie Maytime (1911)
 Marjorie at Seacote (1912)

Dorrance Family
 The Dorrance Domain (1905)
 Dorrance Doings (1906)

Two Little Women
 Two Little Women (1915)
 Two Little Women and Treasure House (1916)
 Two Little Women on a Holiday (1917)

Other novels
 Folly in Fairyland (1901)
 In the Reign of Queen Dick (1904)
 Dick and Dolly (1909)
 Dick and Dolly Adventures (1910)
 The Story of Betty (1911)

Collections
 Mother Goose's Menagerie, illustrated by Peter Newell (Noyes, Platt & Co., 1901) – e-copy at HathiTrust Digital Library 
 Children of Our Town by E. Mars and M. H. Squire with verses by Wells (R. H. Russell, 1902) – e-copy at Library of Congress

Nonfiction prose
 The Technique of the Mystery Story (1913)
 On Finishing Collector (1926)
 The Rest of My Life (1937)

Verse
 At the Sign of the Sphinx (1896)
 Rubaiyat of a Motor Car (Dodd, Mead, 1906), illustrated by Frederick Strothmann
 The Re-Echo club (1913)
 Diversions of the Re-Echo Club (1936)
 Ballade of Baker Street (1939)
 A Whimsey Anthology (New York: C. Scribner's Sons, 1906)

Anthologies (as editor)
 A Parody Anthology (1904)
 A Satire Anthology (1905)
 A Whimsey Anthology (1906)
 A Vers de Société Anthology (1907)
 A Nonsense Anthology (1910)
 Such Nonsense!: An Anthology (1918) (different than A Nonsense Anthology)
 The Book of Humorous Verse (1920)
 The Best American Mystery Stories of the Year (1931, 1932)

References

External links
 
 
 
 
 
 
 Discussion of Wells mystery writing
 Carolyn Wells, "Why Women Read Detective Stories", True Detective Mysteries(September 1930) pp. 18–19, 105-06
 

1862 births
1942 deaths
American women children's writers
American women novelists
American women poets
American mystery writers
American children's writers
American humorous poets
Anthologists
Novelists from New Jersey
People from Rahway, New Jersey
Women mystery writers
20th-century American novelists
20th-century American women writers
20th-century American poets